Mayors of places in Connecticut

References 

Vernon, Connecticut
Vernon